Jaromír Funke (1 August 1896 – 22 March 1945) was a leading Czech photographer during the 1920s and 1930s.

Early life
Funke was born to a wealthy family in house No. 238 in Skuteč on 1 August 1896, the son of Antonín Funke, Bohemian-German lawyer (son of Josef Funke, a Kolín draper) and his wife Miloslava, the daughter of Professor František Potůček. He studied medicine, law, and philosophy at the Charles University in Prague and the University of Bratislava but did not graduate and instead turned to photography.

Style
Funke was recognized for his “photographic games” using mirrors, lights, and insignificant objects, such as plates, bottles, or glasses, to create unique works. In his still life imagery he created abstracts of forms and shadows reminiscent of photograms. His work was regarded as logical, original and expressive in nature. A typical feature of Funke's work would be the “dynamic diagonal."

Career

Later career
During his photography profession, Funke published editorials and critiques about photography. By 1922, Funke had become a skilled freelance photographer and two years later he, Josef Sudek and Adolf Schneeberger created the Czech Photographic Society. From 1931-1935, Funke headed the photography department at the School of Arts and Crafts in Bratislava. Soon after, Funke taught at the School of Graphic Art in Prague until 1944. Alongside Ladislav Sutha, the director of the previous school, Funke published Fotografie vidí povrch in 1935. While travelling, Funke became interested in politically engaged photography and was a contributor to the illustrated weekly Pestrý týden. Bad living, created during the Great Depression of 1930-1931, dealt with poverty. Funke later became an editor of the journal Fotografický obzor ("Photographic Horizons") for several years. He published a number of works including Od fotogramu k emoci which is understood to be his manifesto.

Death
As travelling was limited during World War II in 1939, Funke photographed close to home in Louny, Prague and sometimes Kolín. On March 22, 1945 in Kolin, a few months before the end of the Second World War and its indirect victim as a result of the Allied airstrike, the electricity supply to the hospital in which he was under abdominal surgery was interrupted, and he died. He was buried at the Central Cemetery in Kolín.

References

Bibliography
Dufek Antonín: Jaromír Funke. Průkopník fotografické avantgardy, 1997, Brno, 
Ludvík Souček: Jaromír Funke - Fotografie, 1970, Odeon, Prague
Československý biografický slovník, Encyklopedický institut ČSAV, Academia, Praha, 1992	
Pastor Suzanne E., Dufek Antonín: Jaromír Funke - fotografie 1919-1943 - věci skleněné a obyčejné, Pražský dům fotografie, Praha, 1995	
Birgus V. a kol.: Česká fotografická avantgarda 1918-1948, Kant, Praha, 1999	
Philippe Grand: Vues d' architectures - photographies des XIXe et XXe siecles, 2002, Réunion des Musées Nationaux, Paris, France
Moucha Josef: A flash of avant-garde, or Jaromír Funke, Imago, n. 18, Summer 2004
Dufek Antonín: Jaromír Funke, fotografická publikace, Torst, 2004
Witkovsky, Matthew S.: Jaromír Funke's Abstract Photo series of 1927–1929: History in the making, in: History of Photography 29 (2015) 3, S. 228-239.

External links

 Short biography
 Detailed overview of Funke's work  *Google reports possible malicious content as of 11 Jun 2010

1896 births
1945 deaths
Czech photographers
Charles University alumni
People from Skuteč